Jerzy Walerian Skolimowski (9 December 1907 – 12 February 1985) was a Polish rowing coxswain who competed in the 1928 Summer Olympics, in the 1932 Summer Olympics, and in the 1936 Summer Olympics.

He was born in Łuków and died in London, Great Britain. He is buried at the Powązki Cemetery in Warsaw.

In 1928 he was the coxswain of the Polish boat which finished fourth in the eight event after being eliminated in the quarter-finals. Four years later he won the silver medal as coxswain of the Polish boat in the coxed pair competition as well as the bronze medal as coxswain of the Polish boat in the coxed four competition. In 1936 he was the coxswain of the Polish boat which was eliminated in the repechage of the coxed pair event. He also competed as coxswain of the Polish boat in the coxed four event but they were also eliminated in the repechage.

Skolimowski was also a painter. His work was part of the painting event in the art competition at the 1932 Summer Olympics.

He fought in the September Campaign of World War II.

References

External links
 profile 

1907 births
1985 deaths
Polish male rowers
Burials at Powązki Cemetery
Coxswains (rowing)
Olympic rowers of Poland
Rowers at the 1928 Summer Olympics
Rowers at the 1932 Summer Olympics
Rowers at the 1936 Summer Olympics
Olympic silver medalists for Poland
Olympic bronze medalists for Poland
Polish September Campaign participants
Olympic medalists in rowing
People from Łuków
Sportspeople from Lublin Voivodeship
Medalists at the 1932 Summer Olympics
European Rowing Championships medalists
20th-century Polish painters
20th-century Polish male artists
Olympic competitors in art competitions
Polish male painters
Polish emigrants to the United Kingdom